The swimming competitions at the 2024 Summer Olympics in Paris are scheduled to run from 27 July to 9 August 2024. Pool events (27 July to 4 August) will occur at the Paris La Défense Arena, with the two-day marathon swimming (8 to 9 August) staged at Pont Alexandre III through the Seine River.

Events 
Similar to the 2020 program format, swimming features a total of 37 events (18 each for men and women and 1 mixed event), including two 10 km open-water marathons. The following events were contested (all pool events are long-course, and distances are in meters unless stated):
Freestyle: 50, 100, 200, 400, 800, and 1,500;
Backstroke: 100 and 200;
Breaststroke: 100 and 200;
Butterfly: 100 and 200;
Individual medley: 200 and 400;
Relays: 4×100 free, 4×200 free; 4×100 medley (men's, women's, and mixed)
Marathon: 10 kilometres

Schedule
The swimming program schedule for Paris 2024 will occur in two segments. For the pool events, similar to the case of London 2012, prelims will run in the morning, followed by the semifinal and final sessions in the evening and (due to an NBC request) night session (due to the substantial fees NBC has paid for rights to the Olympics, the IOC has allowed NBC to have influence on event scheduling to maximize U.S. television ratings when possible; NBC agreed to a $7.75 billion contract extension on May 7, 2014, to air the Olympics through the 2032 Games, is also one of the major sources of revenue for the IOC). Several significant changes are instituted to the swimming schedule, with the program extending to nine days for the first time as opposed to the regular eight-day format. The extra day would be used to alleviate the schedules of the swimmers who would compete in the individual and relay events at the same period. Moreover, it relieves a packed schedule that witnesses three new events added to the program at the previous Games.

Qualification

Individual events
World Aquatics establishes qualifying times for individual events. The time standards consist of two types, namely an "Olympic Qualifying Time" (OQT, colloquially known as the A-cut) and an "Olympic Consideration time" (OCT, colloquially known as the B-cut). Each country can enter a maximum of two swimmers per event, provided that they meet the (faster) qualifying time. A country can enter one swimmer per event that meets the invitation standard. Any swimmer who meets the "qualifying" time will be entered into the event for the Games; a swimmer meeting the "invitation" standard is eligible for entry allotted by ranking. If a country does not have a swimmer who meets either of the qualifying standards, it may have entered one male and one female. A country that does not receive an allocation spot but enters at least one swimmer achieving a qualifying standard might have entered those with the highest ranking.

Relay events
Each relay event features 16 teams, composed of the following:
3: top three teams based on their final results achieved at the 2023 World Aquatics Championships in Fukuoka, Japan
13: top thirteen teams, vying for qualification, based on their cumulative fastest times achieved in the heats and finals at both the 2023 and 2024 World Aquatics Championships in Doha, Qatar

Open-water swimming
The men's and women's 10 km races featured 22 swimmers each, three less than those in the Tokyo 2020 roster:

3: the three medalists in the 10 km races at the 2023 World Aquatics Championships in Fukuoka, Japan
13: the top thirteen swimmers vying for qualification at the 2024 World Aquatics Championships in Doha, Qatar
5: one representative from each FINA continent (Africa, the Americas, Asia, Europe, and Oceania).
1: from the host nation (France) if not qualified by other means. If one or more French open water swimmers qualify regularly and directly, their slots will be reallocated to the next highest-ranked eligible swimmers from the 2024 World Aquatics Championships.

Medal summary

Medal table

Men's events

Women's events

Mixed events

See also
Swimming at the 2022 Asian Games
Marathon swimming at the 2022 Asian Games

References

External links 

 
Swimming
Olympics
Swimming at the Summer Olympics
2024 Summer Olympics events
2024 in swimming